Balagarh is a village in Balagarh CD Block in Chinsurah subdivision of Hooghly district in the state of West Bengal, India.

Geography

Location

The Balagarh CD Block is mostly part of the Hooghly Flats, one of the three natural regions in the district composed of the flat alluvial plains that form a part of the Gangetic Delta. The region is a narrow strip of land along the 80 km long stretch of the Hooghly River, that forms the eastern boundary of the district.

Police station
Balagarh police station has jurisdiction over Balagarh CD Block.

Urbanisation
There are 13 statutory towns and 64 census towns in Hooghly district. The right bank of the Hooghly River has been industrialised over a long period. With foreigners dominating the area's industry, trade and commerce for over two centuries, it is amongst the leading industrialised districts in the state. At the same time the land is fertile and agricultural production is significant.

In Chinsurah subdivision 68.63% of the population is rural and the urban population is 31.37%. It has 2 statutory and 23 census towns. In Chinsurah Mogra CD Block 64.87% of the population is urban and 35.13% is rural. Amongst the four remaining CD Blocks in the subdivision two were overwhelmingly rural and two were wholly rural.

The map above shows a portion of Chinsurah subdivision. All places marked in the map are linked in the larger full screen map.

Demographics
As per the 2011 Census of India, Balagarh had a total population of 2,365 of which 1,213 (51%) were males and 1,152 (49%) were females. Population below 6 years was 188. The total number of literates in Balagarh was 1,968 (90.40% of the population over 6 years).

Transport
Balagarh railway station is situated on the Bandel-Katwa Branch Line. It is part of the Kolkata Suburban Railway network.

The State Highway 6 (West Bengal), running from Rajnagar (in Birbhum district) to Alampur (in Howrah district) passes through Balagarh.

Education
 Balagarh Bijoy Krishna Mahavidyalaya (Jirat College), a general degree college, was established in Jirat, near Balagarh in 1985. It is affiliated with the University of Burdwan and offers honours courses in Bengali, English, Political Science, Computer Science, Geography, History, Physics, Mathematics and Accountancy.

 Balagarh High School and Sripur Radharani Girls High School are located at Balagarh Block

References

Villages in Hooghly district